The 1986 Kentucky Derby was the 112th running of the Kentucky Derby. The race took place on May 3, 1986, with 123,819 people in attendance.

Full results

Payout

 $2 Exacta: (1-3) Paid $385.00

References

1986
Kentucky Derby
Derby
Kentucky
Kentucky Derby